The Church of Jesus Christ of Latter-day Saints in Scotland refers to the Church of Jesus Christ of Latter-day Saints (LDS Church) and its members in Scotland.

History

First Missionaries in Scotland

Wright and Mulliner
Two native Scots, Alexander Wright and Samuel Mulliner, became the first missionaries to Scotland after they were converted whilst living in Ontario, Canada, arriving 20 December 1839. The elders began teaching the gospel to their own families, so they traveled to Edinburgh to visit Elder Mulliner's parents. After which Wright traveled to Marnock in Banffshire to share the gospel with his family despite suffering from smallpox. The two elders reunited and began preaching systematically in Glasgow. On 14 January 1840 Mulliner baptised the first converts in Scotland, Alexander Hay and his wife Jessie, in the River Clyde at Bishopton near Paisley. Mulliner and Wright reunited and on 2 February 1840 baptised two young men from Leith. They taught in the area until they were forced to leave due to abuse and persecution.

Orson Pratt's missionary efforts

Orson Pratt arrived in Scotland on 8 May 1840 to supervise the missionaries. At the time of Pratt's arrival, there were 80 Latter-day Saints in the area, thanks to the missionary efforts of Wright and Mulliner so Pratt was able to organise the first branch of the church in Scotland at Paisley. Pratt dedicated Scotland "for the preaching of the gospel" at Arthur's Seat, a hill in Holyrood Park, Edinburgh. Pratt called two more missionaries to the area: Hiram Clark and Reuben Hedlock. They worked alongside Wright in Paisley, while Pratt and Mulliner began proselyting in Edinburgh. Mulliner would return to the United States in 1840.

Pratt and Wright preached in every night in the streets of the city, and were able to baptise 23 new converts by the end of the summer on 1840. Pratt was unsatisfied with their success in the area and decided to try a new approach: writing. While in Edinburgh, Pratt wrote and published the pamphlet An Interesting Account of Several Remarkable Visions. It included the first published account of Joseph Smith's first vision, and with the scriptures, became a standard Church publication in Scotland. Pratt distributed this pamphlet for 10 months until he returned home in March 1841, leaving the mission under George D. Watt. Pratt would later return to Scotland throughout this life to visit the saints there. Wright remained in Scotland until 1842. Due to the efforts of these early missionaries, there were 70 branches by 1848, and by 1853 the church had grown to over 3,000 members.

Church decline in the late 19th century
Early church members were usually workers in lowland industrial areas who turned to religion out of a "reflex of despair." Despite attempts at Gaelic language preaching by William McKay in 1847, and even the printing of a Gaelic language pamphlet "Do Suchdsiridh Kioghachd Dhe" (Seekers after the Kingdom of God) in 1850, few Highlanders joined the church.

With an increase in church membership, there were four conferences held in Scotland in Glasgow, Kilmarnock, Edinburgh, and Dundee between 1855 and 1859. This church growth did not go unnoticed. Some of the church members in the mid-19th century were persecuted. Violent acts occurred in Kirkpatrick when members were stoned, and also in Busby where mobs gathered. In 1850 Scots law "prohibited the disruption of religious assemblies" to avoid violence in Edinburgh.

Despite these strong early beginnings, the church would face a decline in membership after the 1850s due to a number of factors. The church had encouraged members to join with the Saints in the United States and emigrate to Utah. In the 1850s, 1,800 church members emigrated to the U.S. and approximately 1,600 members emigrated during the next decade. Missionaries during this time period also reported that fewer people were interested in learning about the church and there was a "spirit of indifference," perhaps attributed to the reformations and revitalisation of the Church of Scotland. Large groups of church members were also excommunicated for violations of church standards. Scotland was also in a depression during this time which could have contributed to church decline, along with other potential factors. Mormonism was effectively stagnant until the 1960s when new social and economic conditions were established in the country.

In March 1862 the Apostle Amasa Mason Lyman gave a speech in Dundee which, when 5 years later Brigham Young and other Mormon leaders saw a copy of it, would lead to him being stripped of his apostleship.

A well-organised 'anti-Mormon' campaign was mounted by various ministers and Latter-day Saints who had turned from the church. They lectured and published pamphlets accusing the missionary programme of being a disguise for Americans to enslave British girls as polygamous wives. Missionaries were sometimes attacked. Opponents of the LDS Church demanded that Home Secretary Winston Churchill and the Home Office persuade Parliament to expel Latter-day Saint missionaries and refuse entry to more. Churchill opposed exaggerated claims and collected favorable police reports from key cities. When the 'Mormon question' came up in Parliament again, Churchill said that although he had not completed his investigation, he had found nothing against the LDS Church members.

When the First World War began in 1914, all American LDS Church missionaries in Scotland, as throughout the United Kingdom, were evacuated back to the USA. The Lloyd George ministry banned the church's missionaries from reentering Britain in 1918 after the war, despite mission president George Albert Smith's protest that they had peacefully worked in Britain for more than 80 years. Missionaries would not return in significant numbers until mid-1920, after United States Senators Reed Smoot and William H. King caused the American State Department to intervene. The movie Trapped by the Mormons, inspired by Winifred Graham's book of the same title, led to widespread anti-Mormon rhetoric throughout the British Isles. The ban on LDS missionaries was in part because of fears of the prewar anti-Mormon violence resuming, but except for one 1922 attack during a church service in Edinburgh where a crowd of 100 students tarred and feathered two elderly missionaries and a church member, incidents were minor. Although Graham and other anti-Mormons continued to denounce the church, the government told them that there was no evidence that missionaries were acting in a way to justify deportation.

After the outbreak of the Second World War all the church's American missionaries were again evacuated. This was completed by early 1940 when Hugh B. Brown, then serving as president of the British Mission, returned to the USA. In his place a local Latter-day Saint, Andre K. Anastasiou, was appointed. Brown returned to the UK on 29 March 1944 and again began serving as the mission president. American missionaries would begin to return in 1946.

1950s to present
Beginning in the 1950s emigration to the United States began to be discouraged and local congregations began to proliferate. The members in Scotland were in the British Mission until it was split in 1960; they then became part of the North British Mission. The following year the Scottish-Irish Mission was formed, which was later divided. The first stake was formed in Glasgow in 1962, and 13 years later the second stake was established in Dundee. The Scottish mission has since been merged back in with the Irish one.

Today, church members in Scotland participate in all church auxiliary programs including seminary and institute, and many of the young LDS men and women serve missions for the church.

Stakes and Congregations
As of February 2023, the following Stakes and Congregations were located in Scotland:

Aberdeen Scotland Stake
Aberdeen Ward
Bridge of Don Ward
Buchan Ward
Elgin Branch
Invergordon Branch
Inverness Ward
Kirkwall Branch
Lerwick Branch
Stornoway Branch
Thurso Branch

Dundee Scotland Stake
Dundee 2nd Ward
Dundee Bingham Ward
Dunfermline Ward
Kirkcaldy Ward
Montrose Ward
Perth Branch

Edinburgh Scotland Stake
Alloa Ward
Dalkeith Ward
Dumfries Ward
Edinburgh Ward
Falkirk Branch
Galashiels Branch
Livingston Ward

Glasgow Scotland Stake
Airdrie Ward
Cumbernauld Ward
Dumbarton Ward
East Kilbride Ward
Glasgow Ward
Motherwell Ward

Paisley Scotland Stake
Ayr Ward
Greenock Branch
Irvine Ward
Kilmarnock Ward
Paisley Ward
Pollok Ward
Stranraer Branch

Missions
There is currently a single mission serving Scotland, which is shared with Ireland:
Scotland/Ireland Mission

Temples
There are no LDS temples in Scotland.  The Preston England Temple in Lancashire has served Scotland since 1998.

Notable Scottish Latter-day Saints

 Brian Adam — first Latter-day Saint member of the Scottish Parliament, and later became a government minister
 David S. Baxter, First Quorum of the Seventy, born in Scotland, moved to England as a child. 
 Eilley Bowers, born in Scotland, emigrated to the United States after becoming a Latter-Day Saint. She was, in her time, one of the richest women in the United States though she died penniless.
 Johnny Cunningham, folk musician in Silly Wizard, brother of Phil (left the church)
 Phil Cunningham, accordionist and folk musician. (left the church)
 John Lyon, poet and writer of the American frontier.
 Stanley Robertson, master storyteller, ballad singer and author of several books of Lowland Traveller tales.
 Robert Sands (conductor), born in Ireland, but converted while living in Scotland.
 Jane McKechnie Walton, born in Scotland, emigrated to the United States as a young child after her family converted.
 John Ferrans, prominent businessman and well respected leader, from Newburgh in Fife.  Keen to see membership grow and do away with leaders that are in it for themselves.

See also

Religion in Scotland

References

External links

Newsroom (United Kingdom & Ireland)
The Church of Jesus Christ of Latter-day Saints (UK and Ireland) – Official Site
Joseph Smith Papers "An Interesting Account of Several Remarkable Visions, 1840"

 
Christian denominations in Scotland
Religion in Scotland
1837 establishments in the United Kingdom
Harold B. Lee Library-related Americana articles